Virgil Munday Chapman (March 15, 1895March 8, 1951) was an American attorney and Democratic politician who represented Kentucky in the United States House of Representatives and in the United States Senate.

Chapman, originally from Middleton, Kentucky, practiced law in Irvine, Kentucky, then Paris, Kentucky, then Lexington, Kentucky. He was married to Mary Chapman and had one daughter, Elizabeth.

In 1924 Chapman was elected to the United States House of Representatives and served two terms representing Kentucky's 7th Congressional District in the House, 1925-1929. In 1928 Chapman lost his House seat in the Republican landslide as Herbert Hoover was elected president. Chapman was ousted that year by Republican Robert E. Lee Blackburn but defeated Blackburn in a rematch in 1930. Chapman, re-elected to the House in 1930, served two terms, 1931-1935, representing the 7th district. Chapman then was elected to represent Kentucky's 6th district in the House and held that seat from 1935 through 1949.

In 1948 Chapman defeated incumbent John Sherman Cooper for a seat in the United States Senate. An automobile accident in Washington, DC killed Chapman on March 8, 1951. He is buried at Paris Cemetery, at Paris, Kentucky.

Chapman was succeeded in both the House of Representatives and the Senate by Thomas R. Underwood. This is rare but not unique. Dan Quayle, William Hathaway, Henry C. Hansbrough, Jonathan Chace, and Tom Udall were all also succeeded by the same person in both the House and Senate.

See also
 List of United States Congress members who died in office (1950–99)

References

 Memorial services held in the House of Representatives together with remarks presented in eulogy of Virgil Munday Chapman, late a representative from Kentucky

1895 births
1951 deaths
American Disciples of Christ
Kentucky lawyers
People from Bourbon County, Kentucky
People from Estill County, Kentucky
Politicians from Lexington, Kentucky
People from Simpson County, Kentucky
Road incident deaths in Washington, D.C.
Democratic Party United States senators from Kentucky
Democratic Party members of the United States House of Representatives from Kentucky
20th-century American politicians
20th-century American lawyers